Stackhousia clementii is a species of plant in the family Celastraceae.

The species is found across western and central Australia. In Western Australia it is found on sandstone hills scattered across the Kimberley, northern Goldfields-Esperance and Pilbara regions of Western Australia where it grows in skeletal soils.

References

clementii
Plants described in 1927